Annette Kolb (born 14 September 1983) is a German former professional tennis player.

Kolb has won one singles and six doubles titles on the ITF Women's Circuit in her career. On 6 February 2006, she reached her best singles ranking of world No. 344. On 17 July 2006, she peaked at No. 242 in the doubles rankings. Kolb made her WTA Tour debut at the 2006 Banka Koper Slovenia Open. Kolb retirement from professional tennis 2007.

Career 
Kolb started playing tennis aged 7. On 2 January 2001, she reached her best singles junior ranking of world No. 42. On 12 December 2001, she peaked at No. 16 in the doubles rankings. She finished her junior career with a record of 82–68. Her biggest success was the final of the junior 2001 French Open in doubles. Together with Neyssa Etienne lost a Czech Petra Cetkovská and Renata Voráčová.

Junior Grand Slam finals

Girls' doubles

ITF finals

Singles: 5 (1–4)

Doubles: 14 (6–8)

ITF Junior finals

Singles

Doubles

References

External links
 
 

1983 births
Living people
German female tennis players
Sportspeople from Ulm
Tennis people from Baden-Württemberg
20th-century German women
21st-century German women